Sofiane Hassan Bouzian (born 13 July 2000) is a Belgian footballer who plays for Tienen.

Club career
On 27 August 2021, he signed a two-year contract with Tienen in the third-tier Belgian National Division 1.

Personal life
Born in Belgium, Bouzian is of Moroccan descent.

References

2000 births
Belgian sportspeople of Moroccan descent
Living people
Association football goalkeepers
Belgian footballers
K.V. Mechelen players
K.V.K. Tienen-Hageland players
Belgian Pro League players